Chen Bingde (born July 1941) is a retired general (shangjiang) in the People's Liberation Army (PLA). He was the Director-General of the General Armaments Department until September 2007. In this position he acted as the head of the space program of China. He then served as chief of the PLA General Staff Department. He retired in 2012, and was succeeded by General Fang Fenghui as chief of General Staff.

Biography
Chen was born July 1941 in Nantong, Jiangsu. He joined the Chinese Communist Party (CCP) in 1962 and has been a member of the CCP Central Military Commission since 2004. He was former chief of the Nanjing Military Region, a crucial region in Beijing's military strategy against Taiwan. 

In 2004, he was promoted to the director of the General Armaments Department as well as the secretary of CCP's committee. In 2007 he was promoted to head of General Staff Department. He attained the rank of major general in September 1988, lieutenant general in July 1995, and general in 2002. He was a member of CCP's 15th, 16th and 17th central committees.

References

China Vitae
China's General Chen Bingde appointed to key military post (AFP via the Straits Times)

1941 births
Living people
People's Liberation Army generals from Jiangsu
People from Nantong
People's Liberation Army Chiefs of General Staff